Peter John Daniel Rogers (born 20 January 1969 in Maidstone, England) is a former  international rugby union player. Rogers attended Llandovery College in Wales before playing rugby in South Africa and he was initially implicated in the 'grannygate' scandal before being exonerated.

A prop, Rogers attained 18 caps for Wales between 1999 and 2000. He played club rugby for Gauteng Falcons (Transvaal), Bridgend RFC, Maesteg RFC, Pirates Johannesburg, London Irish, Roma, Newport RFC, Cardiff RFC.

Rogers came out of retirement for the 2007–08 season, where he played for the semi-professional Welsh side Bridgend Ravens in the Welsh Principality Premiership.

References

External links
 Wales profile

1969 births
Living people
Bridgend RFC players
Bryncethin RFC players
Cardiff RFC players
English rugby union players
Rugby union players from Maidstone
Newport RFC players
Rugby union props
Wales international rugby union players